Vicente Reyes may refer to:

 Vicente Reyes (politician) (1835–1918), Chilean lawyer, journalist and politician
 Vicente Reyes (footballer) (born 2003), Chilean footballer

See also
 Vicente Reynés (born 1981), Spanish cyclist